Canora Airport  is located adjacent to Canora, Saskatchewan, Canada.

It is a grass landing strip and has no form of permanent facilities.

See also
List of airports in Saskatchewan

References

External links
Page about this airport on COPA's Places to Fly airport directory

Good Lake No. 274, Saskatchewan
Registered aerodromes in Saskatchewan
Canora, Saskatchewan